Eftimie Murgu (called Rudăria until 1970, when it was renamed after the revolutionary born there) is a commune in Caraș-Severin County, western Romania, with a population of 1,822 people. It is composed of a single village, Eftimie Murgu.

Of the commune's inhabitants whose ethnicity was recorded at the 2011 census, 99.5% were Romanians. 85.6% were Romanian Orthodox and 14.2% Baptist.

The commune is named after Eftimie Murgu (1805–1870), a philosopher and member of the 1848 revolutionary movements in Wallachia and the Banat.

References

Communes in Caraș-Severin County
Localities in Romanian Banat